Kushaleshwar Prasad Shankara was an Indian politician, lawyer and trade unionist.

Shankara was the secretary of the University Law Union Society. In 1936 he was one of founders of the Delhi Students Federation along with Kanwar Lal, Mir Mushtaq Ahmad, Ismail Madha and others.

Shankara stood as the Indian National Congress candidate in the Parliament Street constituency. He won the seat, having obtained 5,646 votes (67.21% of the votes in the constituency). As of 1954 he served as president of the Delhi branch of the Indian National Trade Union Congress.

He owned a house in the Bengali Market neighbourhood.

References

Indian National Congress politicians
Members of the Delhi Legislative Assembly
Trade unionists from Delhi